The Journal of Legislative Studies is a quarterly peer-reviewed academic journal covering research on legislatures. It was established in 1995 and is published by Routledge. The editor-in-chief is Philip Norton (University of Hull).

References

External links 
 

English-language journals
Law and public policy journals
Political science journals
Publications established in 1995
Quarterly journals
Taylor & Francis academic journals